Raimondo Pereda (1840 in Lugano – 1915) was an Italian-Swiss sculptor.
 
He was a resident of Milan but born to a Swiss-Italian family. He exhibited in Parma, in 1870, a marble statuette  titled: The First Lesson. At Milan, in 1883, he exhibited another graceful statuette depicting his own son, and a marble bust titled La cuffia della nonna. Another marble sculpture was exhibited in 1886 Milan, titled Duetto, a cui faceva degno riscontro a stucco statue Una doccia. Among his works are: La fidanzata (Woman Engaged to Marry); Triestina (bust); Orphan of Mother, (marble group); La rete d' amore (Web of Love); the statuettes of Silenzio (Silence) and Dolore (Pain); Alla Chiesa; Piccolo affricano (Pygmy); Il dentista del villaggio (Village Dentist), and multiple other bas reliefs and portraits.

He was an honorary associate of the Royal Academy of Fine Arts of Milan in 1890.

References

1840 births
1915 deaths
People from Lugano
20th-century Italian sculptors
20th-century Italian male artists
19th-century Italian sculptors
Italian male sculptors
19th-century Italian male artists